The Protestant Church in East Timor IPTL (Igreja Prostestante iha Timor Lorosa'e), former Christian Church of East Timor GKTT (Gerja Kristen Timor Timur) is a Reformed Protestant denomination in East Timor.

During Portuguese colonial rule in East Timor, which lasted until the country was annexed by Indonesia in 1975, Protestantism was suppressed. The Protestant Christian Church in East Timor came into being in 1979. Synod was established in 1988; that is the founding date of the denomination. Membership grew from 6,668 to 34,625 in 1996. In 1998 it joined the World Communion of Reformed Churches and the World Council of Churches.

The denomination publishes a monthly magazine, Tatoli, which means "message". It has a presbyterian church government.

The church maintains a relationship with the American United Church of Christ.

References

Christianity in East Timor
Reformed denominations in Asia
Members of the World Communion of Reformed Churches